Searchmont may refer to:

Searchmont Motor Company, a defunct automobile manufacturing company
Searchmont, Ontario, a community in the Canadian province of Ontario
Searchmont Resort, a ski resort in Searchmont, Ontario